Chablis is a town and commune in the Yonne department in Bourgogne-Franche-Comté in north-central France.

It lies in the valley of the River Serein.

Wine

The village of Chablis gives its name to one of the most famous French white wines. Chablis is made with Chardonnay, a grape that grows particularly well in the region.

Events
Each year the Festival du Chablisien is held May to June in Chablis, featuring classical, jazz, and world music.

The fifth stage of the 2007 Tour de France departed from Chablis towards Autun.

See also
Communes of the Yonne department

References

Communes of Yonne
Champagne (province)